Jean Douarinou (1906–1987) was a French art director. He was born in Indochina which was then a French colonial possession. He was the elder brother of the cinematographer Alain Douarinou. He was married to the actress Madeleine Sologne.

Selected filmography
 Madame Angot's Daughter (1935)
 Marinella (1936)
 Life Dances On (1937)
 The West (1938)
 Sing Anyway (1940)
 The Stairs Without End  (1943)
 A Woman in the Night (1943)
 The White Truck (1943)
 Dorothy Looks for Love (1945)
 The Other Side of Paradise (1953)

References

Bibliography
 Hayward, Susan. French Costume Drama of the 1950s: Fashioning Politics in Film. Intellect Books, 2010.

External links

1906 births
1987 deaths
French art directors